Kurt Dvorak (3 June 1928 – 23 May 2007) was an Austrian field hockey player. He competed in the men's tournament at the 1952 Summer Olympics.

References

External links
 

1928 births
2007 deaths
Austrian male field hockey players
Olympic field hockey players of Austria
Field hockey players at the 1952 Summer Olympics
Place of birth missing